Samantha Lambert is a Gaelic football player for Ardfinnan and formerly with the Tipperary ladies football team.

Career
In 2017, Lambert captained the Tipperary Ladies football team to win the 2017 All-Ireland Intermediate Ladies' Football Championship, beating Tyrone in the final 1–13 to 1-10.
Two years later she was the captain again as Tipperary won a second Intermediate title in three years with a 2–16 to 1–4 win against Meath in the final.	

In January 2021, Lambert announced her retirement form inter-county football.

Honours

Team

Tipperary
All-Ireland Intermediate Ladies' Football Championship (3): 2008, 2017 (c), 2019 (c)

References

Tipperary ladies' Gaelic footballers
Living people
Year of birth missing (living people)